Ballyclare is a small town in County Antrim, Northern Ireland. It had a population of 9,953 according to the 2011 census, and is located within the Antrim and Newtownabbey Borough Council area.

It sits on the river Six Mile Water. The town probably owes its origins to its being a crossing point of the river, the strategic importance of which is shown by existence of a small Norman motte on the south side of the river and presently located in the War Memorial Park. The broad main street dates from the 17th century. In the centre of the town is the Market Square with the Town Hall. The town grew in the 19th century with the coming of the railway and it became an important industrial town with a large paper mill in the South West of the town and a large Linen Bleach Green. These factories gave their names to the roads leading to them, the Mill Road and the Green Road, but have been closed for some time. It is now a local service centre with a significant dormitory role in relation to Belfast. It is the main focus within the rural area for shopping, education and recreation. To the north is the remnant of Craig Hill, which once provided a wooded backdrop but is now covered with modern housing. Much of the Craig Hill has been quarried for its basalt.

History 
People have lived in Ballyclare for six thousand years. The earliest evidence of people in this area is a hoard of flint arrow heads found when houses were being built north of the river in November 1968. There were a total of thirty-nine flints discovered – some perfectly finished and others are blank indicating an 'industry' and trading here near the river crossing over four thousand years ago.

When the Normans built the castle at Carrickfergus they placed a line of outposts along the river which was then called the "Ollar" – River of the Rushes. In time the soldiers making the journey from Carrickfergus to Antrim reached the river at this spot when they had travelled six miles so began to call the Ollar the Six Mile Water. One of these mottes is close by the river in the War Memorial Park in Ballyclare. There are two on opposite sides of the river at Doagh and one at Antrim. The village grew after the Plantation of Ulster and was granted permission by King George II in 1756 to hold two fairs each year making it an important market centre.

At the same time as the Pilgrim Fathers landed in what is now the United States, Ballyclare was settled by Scots planters. Jonathan Swift preached in Ballyclare and it was from the town that the families of Mark Twain, Sam Houston and General Alexander Macomb left for America. The people of Ballyclare and the surrounding villages played a part in the Irish Rebellion of 1798, and fought in the Battle of Antrim. At the beginning of the 20th century Ballyclare was a growing industrial town with an urban district council and became the largest paper producer in Ireland.

Climate

Demography 
On Census day (27 March 2011) there were 9,953 people living in Ballyclare (4,039 households), accounting for 0.55% of the NI total, an increase of 13.5% on the Census 2001 population of 8,770.

Of these:
 21.64% were aged under 16 years and 14.89% were aged 65 and over;
 52.16% of the usually resident population were female and 47.84% were male;
 85.72% belong to or were brought up in a 'Protestant and Other Christian (including Christian related)' religion and 5.36% belong to or were brought up in the Catholic denomination;
 77.35% indicated that they had a British national identity, 32.53% had a Northern Irish national identity and 4.45% had an Irish national identity (respondents could indicate more than one national identity);
 37 years was the average (median) age of the population;
 15.03% had some knowledge of Ulster-Scots and 1.91% had some knowledge of Irish (Gaelic).

The population has grown significantly over the last 40 years from 1,999 in 1971 to 8,654 in 2001 and 9,953 in 2011, an increase of 398%.

Notable Buildings
 Ballyclare Town Hall developed out of the old  Market House which was a 3–bay, 2–storey building built about 1855. It was later extended and developed with a clock tower being added. The clock has only three faces, with no face on the western side.
 The oldest buildings in the town are the Old Presbyterian Church (established 1642) in the Main Street and its former Manse on the Mill Road ( a private dwelling since 1979), the Old Manse had experienced use as a school during the 1800s as well as having the church lawn tennis court located behind it. The Manse had been remodelled at times in its history retaining some Georgian interior detailing, mainly in the hallway. However renovations in the 1990s revealed that the stone building retains some early worked woodwork including joists dating to possibly the 17th century.
 The current Ballyclare Primary School building was originally built in 1880 and has been vigorously extended ever since.  It includes three stages: the 1880 school house, the 1923s extension, the 1950s extension, the 2006 mobile classrooms addition.
There are two large Post Primary Schools, a grammar school on the Rashee Road and called Ballyclare High School, and a state Secondary School with access from the Doagh Road and Avondale Drive.

Culture

Literature 
Archibald McIlroy's novel When Lint Was in the Bell is a light-hearted, lightly fictionalised chronicle of life in 19th-century Ballyclare. A Ballyclare native, born c. 1860, Mr. McIlroy was lost in the sinking of the RMS Lusitania in 1915.

Music 
Two musical ensembles have represented the town on the regional, national and international stage: the Ballyclare Male Choir since 1933, and the Ballyclare Victoria Flute Band since 1919. The Major Sinclair Memorial Pipe Band is based in the town and is regular in parades and RSPBA competitions.
The Clare Chorale is a mixed voice community based choir in Ballyclare, formed from Ballyclare High School alumni in 2003, it now boasts over 50 members drawn from a range of professions. It aims to entertain and challenge, providing a broad musical repertoire both spiritual and secular. In 2023 they will celebrate their 20th Anniversary. https://www.theclarechorale.org

The May Fair
The Ballyclare May Fair occurs on a Tuesday in May every year, and is part of a week of festivities. The tradition stems from a grant by King George II to hold two yearly fairs, although only the May Fair now survives. The event began as a local horse fair, but representatives of cavalry regiments came from all over Europe to buy there as the reputation of the fair spread. The fair's heyday ended with the First World War, but it is still a well-loved event in the town.

Notable people 
Andy Cairns, guitarist and vocalist in the band Therapy? is from Ballyclare.
Gareth Maybin, European Tour golfer, is from the town.
Willie John McBride, a former Ireland and British & Irish Lions rugby captain, is a resident of the town.
Paddy McNair, a professional footballer with Middlesbrough FC and the Northern Ireland national football team, was a Ballyclare Secondary School.
Jonathan Rea, six time world  superbike champion, is a native of Ballyclare.
Tommy Wright, a former Northern Ireland national football team goalkeeper and manager of St Johnstone and of Kilmarnock.

Transport

Road
The road network in Ballyclare is centred on Main Street, North End and Market Square in the Town Centre. A number of roads lead into the Town Centre including the Hillhead Road from the south, the Doagh Road from the west and the Rashee, Ballyeaston and Ballycorr Roads from the north and north east. Car parking available in the town centre ranges from surface-level parking to free and paid on-street parking.

Rail
Ballyclare had a narrow gauge rail link to Larne and a broad gauge connection to Belfast. Neither of these have been in use since the 1950s. Ballyclare railway station on the narrow gauge Ballymena and Larne Railway opened on 24 August 1878, closed to passenger traffic on 1 October 1930, closed to goods traffic on 3 June 1940 and finally closed altogether on 3 July 1950. The station on the broad gauge Northern Counties Committee railway line opened on 3 November 1884, closed for passenger traffic on 1 January 1938, closed for goods traffic on 2 May 1938 and finally closed altogether on the same date as its narrow gauge counterpart in 1950.
The building was demolished altogether in 2004 and was replaced with a similarly shaped and styled building. The old engine shed, however, remains and is now part of Modern Tyres and is visible from the Hillhead Road.

Education 
Ballyclare Nursery School
Ballyclare Primary School
Fairview Primary School
Ballyclare High School
Ballyclare Secondary School

Sport 
Ballyclare Comrades F.C., based at Dixon Park plays in the NIFL Championship.
Templepatrick Cricket Club also plays at the Cloughan.

References

External links 
Ballyclare Guide and Directory 1888

 
Towns in County Antrim